The stylopharyngeus is a muscle in the head. It originates from the temporal styloid process. It some of its fibres insert onto the thyroid cartilage, while others end by intermingling with proximal structures. It is innervated by the glossopharyngeal nerve (cranial nerve IX). It acts to elevate the larynx and pharynx, and dilate the pharynx, thus facilitating swallowing.

Structure 
The stylopharyngeus is a long, slender, tapered pharyngeal muscle. It is cylindrical above, and flattened below.

It passes downward along the side of the pharynx between the superior pharyngeal constrictor (situated deep to the stylopharyngeus) and the middle pharyngeal constrictor (situated superficial to the stylopharyngeus), and spreads out beneath the mucous membrane.

Origin 
It arises from the medial side of the base of the temporal styloid process.

It is the only muscle of the pharynx not to originate in the pharyngeal wall.

Insertion 
Some of its fibers are lost in the superior and middle constrictor muscles, some merge with the lateral glossoepiglottic fold, while still others join with thos of the palatopharyngeus muscle to insert onto the posterior border of the thyroid cartilage.

Innervation
The stylopharyngeus is the only muscle of the pharynx innervated by the glossopharyngeal nerve (CN IX) (all others being instead innervated by the vagus nerve (CN X)) by special visceral motor neurons with their cell bodies in the rostral part of the nucleus ambiguus.

Blood supply 
The stylopharyngeus receives arterial supply from the paryngeal branch of the ascending pharyngeal artery.

Lymphatic drainage 
The lymphatic drainage of the region of the stylopharyngeus muscle is mediated by the middle cervical lymph nodes that drain into the supraclavicular lymph nodes.

Relations 
The stylopharyngeus is the medial-most and most vertical of the three styloid muscles.

The muscle is situated in between the external carotid artery and internal carotid artery.

On the lateral pharyngeal wall, it is situated posterior to the superior constrictor muscle, and anterior to the buccopharyngeal fascia.

The glossopharyngeal nerve runs on the lateral side of this muscle, and crosses over it to reach the tongue.

Variation 
Supernumerary muscles originating from other nearby regions of the skull may be present, and may be clinically significant.

Development
Embryological origin is the third pharyngeal arch. Its development commences between the 4th and 7th week of gestation.

Function
The stylopharyngeus:
elevates the larynx
elevates the pharynx
dilates the pharynx to permit the passage of a large food bolus, thereby facilitating swallowing

See also 

 Stylohyoid muscle
 Styloglossus muscle

Additional images

References

Muscles of the head and neck